Canciones con alma (Songs with Soul) is a studio album by Mexican singer Flor Silvestre, released in 1972 by Musart Records. It is Flor Silvestre's second bolero album.

Critical reception 
Billboard included the album in its Top Album Picks section and gave it a positive review: "A good solid LP overall of love ballads. Best cuts: 'Vuelve,' 'Tormento,' 'Quisiera.'"

Track listing 
Side one

Side two

Personnel 
 Salomón Jiménez – arranger
 Gustavo A. Santiago – director

References

External links 
 Canciones con alma at AllMusic

1972 albums
Flor Silvestre albums
Musart Records albums
Spanish-language albums